The Solo technical routine competition of the Synchronised swimming events at the 2011 World Aquatics Championships was held on July 17 with the preliminary round held in the morning and the final in the evening session.

Medalists

Results

The preliminary round was held at 09:00 local time. The final was held at 17:15.

Green denotes finalists

References

External links
2011 World Aquatics Championships: Solo technical routine start list, from OmegaTiming.com; retrieved 2011-07-17.

Solo technical routine